Overcast is the state of the sky when it is covered by clouds; a type of weather.

Overcast may also refer to:
 Overcast (app), an iOS, watchOS, CarPlay, and web podcast listening app by Marco Arment
 Overcast (band), an American metalcore band
 Overcast! (album), Atmosphere's first studio album
 Overcast! (EP), an "extended play" album by Atmosphere released prior to Overcast!
 The Overcast, a monthly arts and culture newspaper in St. John's, Newfoundland and Labrador

See also
 Overcast stitch, a type of sewing stitch
 Central dense overcast, large central area of thunderstorms surrounding a cyclone's circulation center (eye)
 Operation Overcast, original name of Operation Paperclip, an Office of Strategic Services program to recruit German scientists after World War II
 Aluminum Overcast, a specific Boeing B-17 Flying Fortress bomber
 Aluminum overcast, the type of bomber generically referred to as an "aluminum overcast" but more commonly known as Convair B-36
 And Every Day Was Overcast, a 2013 photo-illustrated novel by American author Paul Kwiatkowski
 Morning, An Overcast Day, Rouen, a late 19th century painting by Danish-French artist Camille Pissarro
 Overcast Off, a three piece indie rock band based out of Tucson, Arizona
 Overcast Media, a digital media technology company based in Seattle, Washington
 Overcasting, the process of broadcasting content that is meant to be played over and in sync with another piece of content